The 1931–32 season was the 34th in the history of the Southern League. The league consisted of Eastern and Western Divisions. Dartford won the Eastern Division for the second successive season, whilst newly elected Yeovil & Petters United won the Western Division. Dartford were declared Southern League champions after winning a championship play-off 2–1.

Five clubs from the Southern League applied to join the Football League, with Aldershot Town and Newport County being successful.

Eastern Division

A total of 10 teams contest the division, including 8 sides from previous season and two new teams.

Newly elected teams:
 Tunbridge Wells Rangers
 Bournemouth & Boscombe Athletic reserves

Western Division

A total of 13 teams contest the division, including 11 sides from previous season and two new teams.

Team relegated from 1930–31 Football League:
 Newport County
Newly elected team:
 Yeovil & Petters United

Football League election
As Wigan Borough (resigned) and Thames (disbanded) had left the Football League, there were two places available, one in the Third Division North and one in the Third Division South. However, Mansfield Town were transferred from the South to the North division, meaning both vacant positions were in the South division. Five Southern League clubs applied, with Aldershot Town and Newport County (a year after being voted out) being successful in the vote.

References

1931-32
4
1931–32 in Welsh football